Thai Malays (: Jawi: ملايو تاي; Pattani Malay: Oré Nayu, Jawi or Bangso Yawi; Songkhla Malay: Oghae Nayu), with officially recognised terms including 'Malayu-descended Thais' and 'Malay', is a term used to refer to ethnic Malay citizens of Thailand, the sixth largest ethnic group in Thailand. Thailand is home to the third largest ethnic Malay population after Malaysia and Indonesia and most Malays are concentrated in the Southern provinces of Narathiwat, Pattani, Yala, Songkhla and Satun. Phuket and Ranong, home to a sizeable Muslim population, also have many people who are of Malay descent. A sizeable community also exists in Thailand's capital Bangkok, having descended from migrants or deportees who were relocated from the South from the 13th century onwards.

Cultural distinctiveness 

Separatist inclinations among ethnic Malays in Narathiwat, Pattani, Yala and Songkhla provinces, the cause of the Southern Thai insurgency, are due in part to cultural differences from the Thai people as well as past experiences of forced attempts to assimilate them into Thai mainstream culture after the annexation of the Sultanate of Patani by Siamese Rattanakosin Kingdom. In 1816, Siam divided the Muslim tributary Sultanate of Patani into seven provinces as part of a policy of 'divide and rule'. Despite occasional subsequent rebellions, the policy was generally successful in ensuring peace until the beginning of the twentieth century. In 1901, Siam restructured the seven provinces into a single administrative unit, 'Monthon Pathani', under the new Ministry of the Interior, which consolidated the seven provinces into four: Patani, Bangnara, Saiburi and Yala. Kedah was then ceded to the British under the Anglo–Siamese Treaty of 1909, in which a more integrated district formerly belonging to Kedah became Satun Province. The Malay Muslims of Satun are less inclined towards separatism; this is largely a result of the historical affinity of the Malay King of Setul towards Siam, compared to the violent breakup of the Sultanate of Patani. Pro-Thai inclinations can also be observed in Malay communities in Phuket, Ranong and Bangkok.

Language 
The majority of Malays in Thailand speak a distinct variety of Malay known as Pattani Malay (Yawi: Baso Yawi/Pattani). However, not all Thai Malays speak Pattani Malay, some people who live in Satun and its vicinage use another distinct variety of Malay known as Satun Malay, while the Malays up north in Bangkok have developed their distinct variant of Malay that incorporated elements of localism with visible Pattani-Kedahan Malay dialect influences known as Bangkok Malay (Bangkok Malay: Bangkok Melayu/Nayu). The Bangkok, Kedahan and Pattani are closely related and shared many similar vocabularies but still mutually partly unintelligible.

Majority of Malays ethnics in Satun (but also a significant minority in Phatthalung Trang, Krabi, Phang Nga and Songkhla as well as in the Malaysian states of Kedah, Perak and Perlis) are a distinct ethnic group who generally adhere to Islam, but are Thai identity (although with some Malay influences) and speak a Southern Thai interspersed with some Malay loanwords.

Writing system 
With the introduction of Islam to Southeast Asia, the Malays use a modified version of the Arabic script known as Jawi. Unlike other parts of the Malay world, like Malaysia, Singapore and Indonesia, where the usage of Jawi is declining rapidly from the increasing usage of the Latin alphabet, Jawi is still widely used and understood among Malays in Thailand.

Religion 

Thai Malays are mainly Sunni Muslims of Shafi'i sect. Islam is the defining element of the Thai Malay identity.

Conversion out of the faith, particularly to Theravada Buddhism resulting a person to be ostracized as ethnically Thai in spite of their Malay origin.

Notable Thai Malays 
 Thao Thep Kasattri and Thao Sri Sunthon – Heroine and Ancestors of na Thalâng Clan. (Malay descent from Phuket)
 Wan Muhamad Noor Matha (Wanmuhamatno Matha) – Thai Politician (Malay descent from Yala)
 Adul Lahsoh – Thai footballer (Malay descent from Phatthalung)
 Supachai Jaided
 Abdulhafiz Bueraheng
 Sompong Soleb
 Airfan Doloh
 Surin Pitsuwan
 Elias Dolah
 Rosenanee Kanoh – Thai women's cricketer
 Soraya Lateh – Thai women's cricketer
 Abdulhafis Nibu
 Denkaosan Kaovichit

See also
Ethnic groups in Thailand
Islam in Thailand
Languages of Thailand
Mahsuri
Malaysian Siamese
South Thailand insurgency
Singgora Sultanate

Further reading

References

Malays